Qaleh-ye Mohammad or Qaleh Mohammad may refer to:
 Qaleh-ye Mohammad, Khuzestan
 Qaleh-ye Mohammad, Lorestan
 Qaleh-ye Mohammad, North Khorasan

See also
 Qaleh-ye Mohammad Ali Khan
 Qaleh-ye Mohammad Ali Khan, North Khorasan
 Qaleh-ye Mohammad Zia